Glocester is a town in Providence County, Rhode Island, United States. The population was 9,974 as of the 2020 census. The villages of Chepachet and Harmony are in Glocester. Putnam Pike (U.S. Route 44) runs west through the town center of Glocester into Putnam, Connecticut.

History
Glocester was originally named Gloucester for Henry Stuart, Duke of Gloucester. The Town of Gloucester was part of Providence until 1731 when it became an independent town.  North Glocester was incorporated as the separate town of Burrillville in 1806. At the same time the residents of Gloucester voted to change the spelling of the town to Glocester to differentiate it from Gloucester, Massachusetts. Glocester is an ancient variant spelling of Gloucester.

During the American Revolution, Loyalists from Newport were exiled in Glocester to Stephen Keach's farm, including Thomas Vernon, a Tory from Newport, who described Glocester residents in 1776 as: inclined much to talk of liberty...It is amazing what false and erroneous opinions and ideas these people have entertained...The religion of the people of this town consists entirely of New Light Baptists. The custom of Dipping is much in vogue in this and the neighboring towns.  Samuel Willard (physician) made rounds on smallpox victims in North Glocester during the late 18th century.

The Dorr Rebellion began in Glocester in 1841.

Since 1927 the Ancient and Horribles Parade has been an annual Fourth of July tradition in Chepachet, where residents create traditional and satirical political floats.

See also "Foster, Rhode Island: History" for further information.

Geography

Some bodies of water in Glocester include, Waterman Reservoir.

Demographics

As of the census of 2000, there were 9,948 people, 3,559 households, and 2,818 families residing in the town. The racial makeup of the town was 98.48% White, 0.34% African American, 0.15% Native American, 0.24% Asian, 0.10% from other races, and 0.68% from two or more races. Hispanic or Latino of any race were 0.65% of the population.

There were 3,559 households, out of which 38.0% had children under the age of 18 living with them, 66.4% were married couples living together, 8.6% had a female householder with no husband present, and 20.8% were non-families. 15.8% of all households were made up of individuals, and 6.0% had someone living alone who was 65 years of age or older.  The average household size was 2.80 and the average family size was 3.14.

In the town, the population was spread out, with 26.8% under the age of 18, 6.4% from 18 to 24, 31.6% from 25 to 44, 26.1% from 45 to 64, and 9.2% who were 65 years of age or older.  The median age was 38 years. For every 100 females, there were 100.0 males.  For every 100 females age 18 and over, there were 95.6 males.

The median income for a household in the town was $57,537, and the median income for a family was $62,679. Males had a median income of $39,112 versus $29,071 for females. The per capita income for the town was $22,914.  About 3.4% of families and 4.4% of the population were below the poverty line, including 6.4% of those under age 18 and 1.9% of those age 65 or over.

Education
Glocester is the home to both West Glocester Elementary School in West Glocester and the Fogarty Memorial School in Harmony. Students of both would attend both Ponaganset Middle School and Ponaganset High School for secondary education.

Notable people

 Charles J. Fogarty, Rhode Island Rhode Island state senator and 67th Lieutenant Governor of Rhode Island; lived in Glocester
 Ray Fogarty, Rhode Island state representative, lived in Glocester
 Charles H. Page, Rhode Island politician; born in Glocester
 Arthur Steere, businessman and Rhode Island state senator, born in Glocester

National Historic Sites in Glocester
Chepachet Village Historic District
Cherry Valley Archeological Site, RI-279
Glocester Town Pound (1748)
Harmony Chapel and Cemetery (1816)
Manton-Hunt-Farnum Farm (1793)

See also

References

External links

 Town of Glocester website
 Chepachet Fire Department
 Glocester Heritage Society
 Glocester Libraries, Chepachet
 Harmony Library, Harmony

 
Towns in Providence County, Rhode Island
Providence metropolitan area
Towns in Rhode Island